Niels Olsen (born 8 March 1960) is a Danish actor. He appeared in more than forty films since 1990.

Selected filmography

References

External links 

1960 births
Living people
Danish male film actors
Best Actor Robert Award winners